David II (Davit' II) was a 15th-century Catholicos-Patriarch of Georgia consecrated in 1426. He was the fourth son of Alexander I, King of Georgia (r. 1412–1442), by his second wife Tamar of Imereti.

There is no scholarly consensus regarding the duration of David II's tenure as some historians, such Michel Tamarati, place three different catholicoi named David—David II or III (1426–1428), David III or IV (1435–1439), and David IV or V (1447–1457)—in the course of the 15th century, the chronology also accepted by the Georgian Orthodox Church. Others, especially Cyril Toumanoff, see in these three names one and the same person, a son of Alexander I. The confusion arises from the three chronological groups of documents, while the inconsistency in the numerals after the catholical names is because some historians, like Tamarati, omit the catholicos David of 859–861.

According to Toumanoff, David, born c. 1417, was destined by his father for the church career at a young age and became, or was designated to become, a catholicos in 1426. In the view of Toumanoff, his tenure lasted until his death c. 1457, while the two other contemporary catholicoi, Theodore and Shio, mentioned in the years 1427–1434 and 1440–1446, respectively, were his locum tenentes with the title of catholicos while David was still very young and before he himself acceded to the primacy of the Georgian church c. 1447.

Ancestry

Notes

References

1410 births
1450s deaths
Catholicoses and Patriarchs of Georgia (country)
15th-century Eastern Orthodox archbishops
Bagrationi dynasty of the Kingdom of Georgia
15th-century people from Georgia (country)